Carlo Della Corna (died 26 August 2018) was an Italian professional football player and manager.

Career
Born in Monza, Della Corna played as a goalkeeper for Varese, Chieti, Udinese, Perugia, Como and Pavia.

After retiring as a player he worked as a manager and coach, primarily with youth players.

References

1950s births
2018 deaths
Italian footballers
S.S.D. Varese Calcio players
S.S. Chieti Calcio players
Udinese Calcio players
A.C. Perugia Calcio players
Como 1907 players
F.C. Pavia players
Serie A players
Serie B players
Serie C players
Association football goalkeepers
Italian football managers
Sportspeople from Monza
Footballers from Lombardy